The Regius Professorship of Civil Law is one of the oldest and most prestigious of the professorships at the University of Cambridge.

The chair was founded by Henry VIII in 1540 with a stipend of £40 per year, and the holder is still chosen by the Crown.

Regius Professors of Civil Law 

 Thomas Smith (1540)
 Humphrey Busby (1547?)
 Walter Haddon (1551)
 William Soone (1561)
 William Clarke (1563)
 Thomas Legge (1570?)
 Thomas Bynge (1574)
 John Cowell (1594)
 Thomas Morrisson (1611)
 Thomas Goad (1635)
 John Clark (1666)
 John Boord (1673)
 John Oxenden (1684)
 Thomas Ayloffe (1703)
 Francis Dickins (1714)
 Henry Monson (1755)
 William Ridlington (1757)
 Samuel Hallifax (1770)
 Joseph Jowett (1782)
 James William Geldart (1814)
 Henry James Sumner Maine (1847)
 John Thomas Abdy (1854)
 Edwin Charles Clark (1873)
 William Warwick Buckland (1914)
 Patrick William Duff (1945)
 Peter Gonville Stein (1968)
 David Eric Lothian Johnston (1993)
 David John Ibbetson (2000)
 Helen Scott (2022)

References

 
Civil Law, Regius
School of the Humanities and Social Sciences, University of Cambridge
1540 establishments in England
Civil Law, Cambridge
Civil Law, Regius, Cambridge